Darreh Seydi (also Romanized as Darreh Şeydī and Darreh Şeyydī) is a village in Darreh Seydi Rural District, in the Central District of Borujerd County, Lorestan Province, Iran. At the 2006 census, its population was 469, in 131 families.

References 

Towns and villages in Borujerd County